Akiba's Trip: The Animation is an anime adaptation of the Akiba's Trip video game series. It was animated by Gonzo and aired from January 4, 2017 to March 29, 2017.

Plot
The series revolves around otaku teenager Tamotsu Denkigai and his sister Niwaka who are presently shopping in Akihabara, Tokyo, Japan. Suddenly, without warning, vampiric, cosplaying monsters known as "Bugged Ones" run rampant throughout the city. These creatures can possess anyone by biting them, and soon they cause total mayhem across the city. As Tamotsu is about to be attacked by one of these creatures, a mysterious girl wielding a baseball bat named Matome Mayonaka swings in and rescues him.

Together, Tamotsu and Matome fight against more Bugged Ones and their encounters with them keeps increasing. However, whilst protecting Matome, Tamotsu gets fatally injured by a Bugged One. Unaware to him, Matome is actually a high level Bugged One who is trying to protect the city. Left with no other choice, she revives him as a high level Bugged One and coerces him into joining her in battle.

Tamotsu, Matome, Niwaka team up with avid cosplayer Arisa Ahokainen and form a group called  "The Electric Mayonnaise". While fighting, they notice that the only way to destroy the Bugged Ones is to rip their clothes off and expose them to sunlight. Taking advantage of this weakness, they vow to save their city from the Bugged Ones' wrath.

Characters

Main characters

An otaku who got turned into a Bugged One by Matome after he sacrificed his life to save her. He now helps Matome in her fight with the bugged ones and forming the vigilante group Electric Mayonnaise.  Tamotsu is very focused on whatever hobby catches his interest, often ignoring responsibilities over his obsession. Among all his hobbies, he greatly enjoys playing with older technology, such as eight bit arcade games and amateur radio devices. He will take odd jobs to pay for his Otaku habits.

Towards the anime's end, Tamotsu develops feelings for Matome.

A high class Bugged One who protects Akiba from her kind. She is designated as the leader of vigilante group Electric Mayonnaise, a name she was originally against but accepted quickly. She is often referred to as "Mayo" by her friends as her last name is very similar to the word "mayonnaise". She saved Tomatsu's life by invoking a ritual to transform him into a Bugged One by sharing a kiss with him. She, Arisa and Niwaka formed an idol group with a former idol as their manager. Matome is Urame's twin sister and Fukame's granddaughter. Having lived in Akiba for so long, she has developed a love for food and enjoys eating at the restaurants scattered around the city.

Matome develops a crush on Tamotsu early on but doesn't convey her feelings to him until near the end of the anime.

A Finnish otaku who often dresses in cosplay outfits. Although human, Arisa possess superhuman strength and is fluent in several Martial arts. She is the third member of Electric Mayonnaise.  She, Matome, and Niwaka, formed an idol group with a former an idol as their manager. Her catchphrase is "Moi", which means "Hi" or "Hello" in Finnish.

Tamotsu's younger sister. She is a middle schooler and like her brother, Niwaka is an otaku and is often with him on many of his adventures in Akiba. She provides financial support and relays messages back to their parents when she visits. She, Matome and Arisa formed an idol group with a former idol as their manager. Both she and Arisa were aware very early about Matome's crush on Tamotsu.

An intelligent Indian professor who moves around on a Segway. Her original intention was the study the bugged ones but has become a support member of Electric Mayonnaise. Often giving the group advice and providing inventions for their battles.

Tamotsu's otaku friend who knows a lot about Akihabara. Often giving him advice on whatever hobby Tamotsu is working on at the moment. He has a very simplistic design similar to an emoji.

Vigilante Group

Metrotica

A mysterious woman who wears black clothes. She is revealed to be the Leader of Metrotica, and is also Matome and Urame's grandmother. She believes humans have corrupted and tinted Akiba. Fukame now wants to control and manipulate them to bring Akiba back to its former glory, or removed from the area all together. Even if it means destroying Akiba and rebuilding it back in her image.

A GonTuber who works for Metrotica.

Matome's twin sister and Fukame's granddaughter. She resents her sister for leaving the clan. Believing Matome had betrayed her and their grandmother's dream of ridding Akiba of its tainted corruption.

A High Class Bugged One who runs a military weapons shop.

A freelance photographer and Chibusa's camera man.

She is the CEO of Mofmap.

He is the CEO of the "Maid & Butler Izakaya GON-chan cafe".

She is Master's manager.

He is a well known competitive eater.

Other characters

Akiba's popular Free Agent Maid. She is very tall.

She runs an “Anything Agency" Job center.

A former idol who is the manager of the idol group formed by Matome, Niwaka and Arisa.

A former study partner of Ratu.

She is a well known gamer.

Head Butler at the "Maid & Butler Izakaya GON-chan cafe".

Head Maid at the "Maid & Butler Izakaya GON-chan cafe".

Master

He is a former teacher of Arisa.

He is the CEO of the Princess Company.

Anime
An anime television series adaptation titled Akiba's Trip: The Animation was announced at Tokyo Game Show on September 15, 2016. The anime is meant to commemorate studio Gonzo's 25th anniversary. It is directed by Hiroshi Ikehata and written by Kazuho Hyodo, with animation by Gonzo. Character designs are produced by Hajime Mitsuda. The opening theme song is "Ikken Rakuchaku Goyoujin", performed by the voice actress music unit Earphones, while each episode features a different ending theme song by various singers or bands under the album title "AKIBA'S COLLECTION". The series aired from January 4, 2017 to March 29, 2017, and was broadcast on AT-X, Tokyo MX and BS Fuji.

Crunchyroll streamed the series while Funimation streamed an English dub. It is the first Funimation simuldub with episodes released the day of the original Japanese broadcast. The series was being used as a testing ground for faster simuldub releases with the goal to have new episodes out thirty minutes after the Japanese premiere.

Episode list

Notes

References

External links
  
 

Gonzo (company)
Funimation
2017 anime television series debuts
Anime television series based on video games
Action anime and manga